Marc Zermati (21 June 1945 – 13 June 2020) was a French producer and promoter of punk rock music, and businessman.

Life and career
Zermati, a Sephardic Jew, was born in Algiers and arrived in France in the 1960s.  A fan of jazz and blues, he owned the Open Market record shop in Les Halles, Paris, selling mostly US garage and punk rock music from London, Amsterdam and New York City.  The shop closed in 1977.

In 1972 he co-founded the Skydog record label, which issued its first release, the Flamin' Groovies' Grease 7" EP in May 1973, pre-dating Stiff Records by over 3 years, and formed the first independent shop distribution in France.  In August 1976, and again in 1977, Zermati organised the "first European punk rock festival" in the French town of Mont-de-Marsan. He organised tours in France by bands including The Clash, Dr. Feelgood, The Heartbreakers, and Eddie and the Hot Rods, as well as concerts by the Ramones and Talking Heads.

In 1976 he set up Bizarre Distribution with Larry Debay, an independent record distribution company in London that giving an outlet for new independent labels.   His Skydog label issued records by The Damned, Motörhead, MC5, Iggy and the Stooges and dozens of others. He also managed bands including the Lou's and Stinky Toys, and organised international tours by Les Dogs and Flamin' Groovies.

In the 1990s he set up a record label called "Kind of Groove" as a Skydog subsidiary label, presenting experimental, electronic and acid jazz music.  Bands like the Japanese/French U.F.O., the German Marc Ashmann or the French/American CFM Band did several records on this label.

Zermati died on 13 June 2020 from a heart attack.

Festival and tour organiser
The Heartbreakers  ('76) 
Eddie and the Hot Rods
Chrissie Hynde
The Clash
Wilko Johnson
Dogs
Big Audio Dynamite
The Damned
Happy Mondays
Mano Negra
Daft Punk
Air
Atom Rhumba

Productions
 Motörhead
 New York Dolls
 Johnny Thunders
 Wayne Kramer
 MC5
 Flambeurs
 Bebe Buell.
 Iggy Pop
 Flamin' Groovies
 Kim Fowley
 54 Nude Honeys
 Marc Ashmann
 Pimpi Aroyo/ City Zen
 United Future Organization
 CFM Band
 Bossa Nova Beatniks

References

External links
 

1945 births
2020 deaths
Algerian Jews
French record producers
Musicians from Paris
Musicians from Algiers
Pieds-Noirs